Noel Kelly (28 December 1921 – August 1991) was an Irish footballer who played as a forward during the 1940s.

Career
Kelly played for Bohemians during the 1940s in the League of Ireland and was a member of the 1945 Bohemian Inter City Cup winning team against Belfast Celtic at Dalymount Park. He moved to Shamrock Rovers for the 1945/46 season and played in the 1946 FAI Cup Final.

He then transferred to Glentoran and then to English side Arsenal in October 1947. Mainly a reserve, he made just the one first-team appearance for Arsenal, against Everton at Goodison Park on 25 February 1950 in a 1–0 win.

He moved to Crystal Palace in March 1950 and signed for Nottingham Forest in August 1951, where he won his one and only cap for the Republic of Ireland, against Luxembourg in 1954. In July 1955 he moved to Tranmere Rovers to become player-manager, but his tenure was unsuccessful and brief, with Rovers having to apply for re-election to the League in 1957. He left Tranmere in 1957 and did not work in football again, as he ran a sports clothes shop on the Wirral. He died on 28 December  1991.

Noel's son John followed in his footsteps by playing for Tranmere Rovers and several other clubs.

Honours
Bohemians
Inter City Cup: 1945

References

External links
 
 
 

1921 births
1991 deaths
Republic of Ireland association footballers
Association football forwards
Republic of Ireland international footballers
League of Ireland players
Bohemian F.C. players
Shamrock Rovers F.C. players
Glentoran F.C. players
NIFL Premiership players
Arsenal F.C. players
Crystal Palace F.C. players
Nottingham Forest F.C. players
Tranmere Rovers F.C. players
Republic of Ireland football managers
Tranmere Rovers F.C. managers
English Football League players